Antonio Muñiz (August 3, 1969 – Chihuahua Mexico) is an abstract surrealist artist from Los Angeles.

Biography

Early life
Antonio Muñiz was born on August 3, 1969, in Chihuahua, Chihuahua, Mexico. Muñiz lived and went to school in Chihuahua before moving to Chicago, Illinois, at the age of 16 where he continued his schooling and graduated from high school. He then moved to San Diego, California, to study architecture and graduated in 1996 with a bachelor's degree in Architecture from the New School of Architecture. In 1997 Muñiz moved to Los Angeles, and worked for a few Architectural firms. In 2002 he then created his own design company called Muniva Design Group. This allowed Muñiz to choose the architectural work he wanted to work on, which gave him the flexibility to pursue his interest in art and start establishing himself as an abstract surrealist artist.

Work
Muñiz's main medium is oil on canvas, and since 2006 has been mentored by Rodrigo Pimental, a well known Mexican artist from Mexico City. Through Rodrigo Pimental, Muñiz was introduced to Andrés Blaisten, who is the leading authority on Mexican Modern Art and has the world's largest private collection of Modern Mexican Art, which is on permanent display at Museo Andrés Blaisten in Mexico City. Andrés Blaisten suggested to Muñiz that he study Wolfgang Paalen, where Muñiz discovered the technique of Fumage. Since 2010 Muñiz studied and applied the fumage technique and created his first collection of fumage paintings and drawings titled Metamorphosis.

Metamorphosis
On September 15, 2012, at the Couturier Gallery in Los Angeles, Antonio exhibited his first complete work of fumage paintings and drawings titled Metamorphosis. Muñiz received praising reviews from the show by Art Ltd Magazine and Art Scene. The show ran from September 15, 2012, to October 20, 2012.

Paintings
Listed below are a few paintings from the collection using the fumage technique with oil on canvas:

Drawings
Listed below are a few drawings from the collection using fumage, Gouache and color pencil on paper:

References

External links
Antonio Muñiz's Official Website
Couturier Gallery (Los Angeles representing gallery website)
Galería Oscar Román (Mexico City representing gallery website)

Abstract painters
American surrealist artists
Mexican surrealist artists
1969 births
Living people
Artists from Chihuahua (state)
Artists from Los Angeles
People from Chihuahua City
20th-century Mexican painters
Mexican male painters
21st-century Mexican painters
20th-century Mexican male artists
21st-century Mexican male artists